Petersburg Generating Station is a major coal-fired power plant in Indiana, rated at 2.146-GW nameplate capacity. Petersburg G.S. is owned and operated by AES Indiana (formerly known as Indianapolis Power & Light).

Units 1, 2, and 3, rated at 281.6, 523.3, and 670.9 MWe, were launched into operation in 1967, 1969, and 1977 respectively. Unit 4, rated at 670.9 MWe, was launched in 1986. There are also three minor oil-burning internal combustion units, rated at 2.7 MWe each, all launched in 1967.

See also

 List of largest power stations in the United States
 List of power stations in Indiana
 Global warming

References

Energy infrastructure completed in 1967
Energy infrastructure completed in 1969
Energy infrastructure completed in 1977
Energy infrastructure completed in 1986
Buildings and structures in Pike County, Indiana
Coal-fired power stations in Indiana